The Hôtel-Dieu of Carpentras is one of the oldest hospitals in Comtat Venaissin, in Vaucluse. Built in 1754 by Joseph-Dominique d'Inguimbert, it was used as a hospital until 2002. In the near future, the bibliotheque Inguimbertine will be transferred to this place.

History
In 1735, Joseph-Dominique d'Inguimbert became bishop of Carpentras, his native town, after two decades in Rome. This former Dominican, who was passionate about culture and literature as well as science, was the founder of two institutions carpentrasiennes: a library, which now bears his name, Bibliothèque Inguimbertine, and the Hôtel-Dieu. The first stone was laid on September 18, 1750. The plans were drawn by Antoine d'Allemand, to whom we must include the Hotel Salvador in Avignon. The initial price was 350,000 livres. Funds of the bishop were added to 110,000 livres from the municipality. The chapel has dedicated funding of 95,000 livres.

References

External links

Trouver la meilleure offre de santé

Infrastructure completed in 1754
Hospital buildings completed in the 18th century
Hospitals in Provence-Cote-d'Azur
Buildings and structures in Vaucluse
Carpentras
1754 establishments in France
Hospitals established in the 1750s
18th-century architecture in France